The Fiat BGA (Bombardamento Genio Aeronautico) was an aircraft designed by Aldo Guglielmetti of the Italian Air Force.

It was built at Pisa by the Fiat subsidiary Costruzioni Meccaniche Aeronautiche SA (CMASA), hence it was also called the CMASA BGA. It was not ordered into production, and only one was built.

Development
The BGA was designed by Aldo Guglielmetti to meet a 1934 Italian Air Force requirement for a medium bomber. It first flew in 1936, powered by two Fiat A.80 radial engines. It had a retractable tailwheel landing gear, with the main gear retracting into the engine nacelles. It had twin elliptical fins and rudders, and had a cut-down fuselage to the rear of its ventral and dorsal gun positions.

It did not perform well during testing, was removed from the contest, and only the prototype was produced.

Specifications

See also

References

Notes

Bibliography

BGA
1930s Italian bomber aircraft
Aircraft first flown in 1936
Twin piston-engined tractor aircraft
Abandoned military aircraft projects of Italy